Bricktown is an entertainment district just east of downtown Oklahoma City, Oklahoma, United States. It was formerly a major warehouse district. The major attractions of the district are the Chickasaw Bricktown Ballpark, the navigable Bricktown Canal, and the 16-screen Harkins movie theatre.

Boundaries and management
Bricktown Entertainment District includes some 50 square city blocks bounded between the Oklahoma River on the south, I-235 on the east, Deep Deuce District to the North, and the Oklahoma City Central Business District to the West. The general boundary of the Bricktown Core Development District (also known as Upper Bricktown) is as follows: An area bordered generally by the BNSF Railway; Reno Avenue; Centennial Expressway; and the railroad right-of-way between Main and NE 1st.

The district is administered by the Bricktown Urban Design Committee which was established by the City of Oklahoma City to oversee modifications to the buildings and new construction within the district. Downtown Oklahoma City Inc. (an arm of the Greater Oklahoma City Chamber of Commerce) is charged with maintenance and operations of the district and oversees promotion alongside the Oklahoma City Tourism and Visitors Bureau. All entities are united with the ultimate goal of preserving Bricktown's historic 'warehouse district' flavor while allowing modern entertainment, commercial, retail, and residential development to flourish.

History

Four railroad companies had freight operations east of the Santa Fe tracks in what is now Bricktown in the late 19th and early 20th century. The first brick structures, which were typically only one or two stories, appeared between 1898 and 1903. Larger brick buildings were constructed between 1903 and 1911, and the tallest brick buildings were built between 1911 and 1930. Working-class houses were built nearby.

Oklahoma City's first black newspaper, the Black Dispatch, was located in Bricktown at 228 E. First; it reported on the struggle to end racially segregated housing in the city. Also in that area was the first local chapter of the National Association for the Advancement of Colored People (NAACP), founded in the early 20th century to work for the civil rights of African Americans.

The decline of the area began with the onset of the Great Depression, which diminished businesses in the area. The growth of eastern suburbs and subsidized highways during and after World War II attracted many residents to newer housing. Railroads restructured and freight traffic moved to trucks and highways. By 1980, Bricktown had become a cluster of abandoned buildings.

In the 1990s, mayor Ron Norick persuaded Oklahoma City residents to approve a series of tax incentives to lure new businesses, but these were not sufficient. A visit to Indianapolis, Indiana, which had recently beat the city in a competition for a new airline maintenance plant, led him to believe that Oklahoma City needed a vibrant downtown. It lacked the range of activities and amenities to attract more residents and visitors. Along with Greater Oklahoma City Chamber President Ray Ackerman, Norick and their staffs developed the Metropolitan Area Projects or MAPS, which approval led to the construction of the Bricktown ballpark and a tree-lined, mile-long canal through the district, as well as other projects in downtown. The ballpark opened in 1998 and the canal opened in July 1999. Water taxis carry visitors to different stops along the canal, including many restaurants, shops and nightclubs.

Arts and culture
The district contains a number of public sculptures and murals, including a monument to the Oklahoma Land Run. The Centennial Land Run Monument, a large bronze sculpture by artist Paul Moore, is at the south end of Bricktown Canal. It commemorates the Land Run of 1889, which marked the opening of the Unassigned Lands area to settlement. This area is now a city park, open 24 hours a day, year round, and there is no admission fee.

An annual Bricktown Art Festival is held in mid-July.

Transportation
Amtrak's Heartland Flyer service to Fort Worth departs every morning from the old Santa Fe Depot, located by the west entrance to Bricktown, and returns in the evenings.

References

External links 

 
 Case, J. I., Plow Works Building
Avery Building
Voices of Oklahoma interview with Ray Ackerman. First person interview conducted with Ray Ackerman on September 30, 2009. Original audio and transcript archived with Voices of Oklahoma oral history project.
Bricktown Urban Design Committee

 
Busking venues
Districts of Downtown Oklahoma City
Economy of Oklahoma City
Entertainment districts in the United States
Historic districts in Oklahoma
Redeveloped ports and waterfronts in the United States
Tourist attractions in Oklahoma City
Warehouse districts of the United States